Christopher James Colmer (November 21, 1980 – December 28, 2010) was an American football offensive tackle in the National Football League. He played professionally for the Tampa Bay Buccaneers.

Early years
Colmer graduated from Earl L. Vandermeulen High School, located in his hometown of Port Jefferson, New York. He was named to the All-Long Island squad and the Golden 50 All-State team, where he was a team captain playing tackle. He was also a USA Today honorable mention All-American.

College career
Colmer went to college at North Carolina State and was the first person from his high school to earn a Division I scholarship in 27 years. In his junior year, he was co-winner of the teams' Jim Richter Award, giving annually by North Carolina State to the team's best offensive lineman. In 2003, he missed his college season due to Parsonage Turner Syndrome.

Professional career
Colmer was drafted 91st in the 2005 NFL Draft. The Tampa Bay Buccaneers received this pick in a trade with the San Diego Chargers. He was released on June 6, 2007, due to a shoulder injury

Death
Colmer was teaching as a technology teacher at Little Flower U.F.S.D. and coaching at Centereach High School on Long Island in New York, when he died at the age of thirty on December 28, 2010.

References

External links
 
ESPN.com stats
Tampa Bay Buccaneers bio

1980 births
2010 deaths
People from Port Jefferson, New York
American football offensive tackles
NC State Wolfpack football players
Tampa Bay Buccaneers players
Players of American football from New York (state)